The Hacienda del Lencero is a Spanish Colonial architecture era building and gardens located near of Xalapa city, in the state of Veracruz in eastern Mexico.   The house, which takes its name from Juan Lencero, a soldier of Hernán Cortés, was the property of Antonio López de Santa Anna in the 19th century.

Historic house museum
Today, it is a historic house museum which displays furniture and items dating from this period.  It also has a chapel and spacious gardens surrounding the property which include a sculpture by Gabriela Mistral who spent time there while in exile.

External links
Ciudad Xalapa.net: Museo del Lencero website - with images

Xalapa
Historic house museums in Mexico
Museums in Veracruz
Gardens in Mexico
Spanish Colonial architecture in Mexico
Buildings and structures in Veracruz
Lencero